Ek Aastha Aisi Bhee is an Indian Hindi television drama, produced by Shoonya Square Productions. The series starred Tina Ann Philip and Kanwar Dhillon. It premiered on 3 April 2017 on Star Plus and aired from Monday through Saturday during the Star Plus Dopahar (afternoon) programming block. The series ended on 30 September 2017 with the discontinuation of the Star Plus Dopahar block.

Plot
The series revolves around Aastha, an atheist girl from Manali, who gets married into a very religious family in Kolkata and tries to save the family from Guru Maa's ploys. Aastha's and Shiv's love is meant to be. Radhika, Shiv's ex-girlfriend comes and destroys their love by creating misunderstandings between them. Shiv wants Aastha to stop his marriage with Radhika. But Aastha thinks that if Shiv loves her he will not marry Radhika. Shiv and Aastha love each other a lot but are unable to tell each other. Radhika and Gurumas plan fails when Astha exposes Radhika through the use of a recorder. During their engagement, Astha uses technology to show how Radhika conspired against the whole family to obtain her interest. After Radhika is exposed, gurumaa says that she wants to do 'aarti' before she leaves the household to which the members retaliate. But, on Asthas convincing, the family members agree. Gurumaa gives prashad which contains sleeping pills. In the parallel scene, Radhika comes in Asthas room and holds her up against the wall with a knife. Arguments continue between Lakshmi, Gurumaa and others. Eventually, Shiv rescues Astha under the pretext of marrying Radhika. The show ends on a happy note that a person's character cannot be judged based on their religious views. An atheist person can be a good human and a religious person can be a bad human.

Cast

Main cast
 Tina Ann Philip as Aastha Shiv Agarwal: Shiv's wife.
 Kanwar Dhillon as
Shiv Govind Agarwal: Aastha's husband. 
Om Govind Agarwal: Shiv's twin brother.
 Sharanpreet Kaur as Guru Maa, known also as Sandhya 
 Palak Pusarwani as Radhika, Guru Maa's daughter and Shiv's ex-girlfriend

Recurring cast

 Vivek Mushran as Govind Agarwal, Shiv's father
 Manasi Salvi as Lakshmi Govind Agarwal, Shiv's mother and Govind's wife
 Hemant Choudhary as Nandlal Agarwal, Shiv's uncle and Govind's younger brother
 Manisha Dave as Jaya Nandalal Agarwal, Shiv's aunt and Nandalal's wife
 Mayank Sharma as Angad Nandalal Agarwal, Nandalal and Jaya's son
 Sameeksha Sud as Janki Angad Agarwal, Angad's wife
 Anita Kulkarni as Sharda, Aastha's mother
 Nikhil Sharma as Ashok, Aastha's brother
 Vaani Sharma as Gayatri Govind Agarwal
 Abhinav Kapoor as Balwan Agarwal, Shiv's brother. Balwan is the adopted son of the Agarwal family.
 Ambika Soni as Runjhun Balwan Agarwal, Balwan's wife and Aastha's sister
Rashi Khanna as Aastha
Tottempudi Gopichand

Production

Development
Initially titled as Nastik while in pre-production, the title Ek Aastha Aisi Bhee was finalized then.

This was one of the four dramas which was launched on 3 April 2017 during afternoon band of Star Plus Dopahar Block, reviving Star Plus' afternoon new programming after years.

In May 2017, while the leads Tina Philip and Kanwar Dhillon were shooting for a sequence in a lake of Film City, Philip drowned while Dhillon saved her.

A fire broke out on 9 August 2017 which destroyed some parts of the sets while none got hurt. The series is going to be featured in  Starlife as Prayers of love

Casting
Tina Philip and Kanwar Dhillon were cast as the leads. Besides Sharanpreet Kaur, Manasi Salvi, Pallavi Rao, Anita Kulkarni, Palak Purswani, Lilly Patel, Supriya Sarna, Vivek Mushran, Abhinav Kapoor, Hemant Choudhary, Manisha Dave, Mayank Sharma, Samiksha Sud, Nikhil Sharma, Vaani Sharma and Ambika Soni were cast then.

Filming
Although set in Kolkata, the series is filmed at the sets created in Mumbai at Film City, Goregaon. Some earlier episodes were shot in Kolkata and Manali.

Cancellation
With the serials in the afternoon block not being able to garner the expected numbers in its ratings, the channel shut the show on September 30, 2017.

References

2017 Indian television series debuts
Hindi-language television shows
Indian television soap operas
Indian drama television series
StarPlus original programming
Television shows set in Kolkata
2017 Indian television series endings